Franklin Brockson, (August 6, 1865 – March 16, 1942) was an American lawyer and politician from Wilmington in New Castle County, Delaware. He was a member of the Democratic Party, who served in the Delaware General Assembly and as U. S. Representative from Delaware.

Early life and family
Brockson was born in Blackbird Hundred, New Castle County, Delaware. He graduated from the Wilmington Conference Academy at Dover in 1890.

Professional and political career
Brockson began his career as a teacher and principal in the public schools at Port Penn and Marshallton, Delaware. He studied the law and graduated from the law department of Washington and Lee University in Lexington, Virginia in 1896, when he was admitted to the Bar, and commenced practice in Wilmington, Delaware. In 1908 Brockson was elected to the State House for the 1909/10 session.

Brockson was elected to the U.S. House of Representatives in 1912. During this term, he served in the Democratic majority in the 63rd Congress. He was a supporter during that time of corporal punishment. Seeking reelection in 1914, he lost to Republican Thomas W. Miller, a lawyer from Wilmington, and son of the incumbent Governor Charles R. Miller. Brockson served from March 4, 1913, until March 3, 1915, during the administration of U.S. President Woodrow Wilson. He then resumed the practice of law in Clayton and Wilmington.

Death and legacy
Brockson died at Clayton on March 16, 1942, and is buried in the Odd Fellows Cemetery at Smyrna, Delaware.

Almanac
Elections are held the first Tuesday after November 1. Members of the General Assembly take office the second Tuesday of January. State Representatives have a two-year term. U.S. Representatives took office March 4 and also have a two-year term.

References

Specific

External links
Biographical Directory of the United States Congress 
Delaware's Members of Congress
Find a Grave
The Political Graveyard

Places with more information
Delaware Historical Society; website; 505 North Market Street, Wilmington, Delaware 19801; (302) 655-7161
University of Delaware; Library website; 181 South College Avenue, Newark, Delaware 19717; (302) 831-2965
Newark Free Library; 750 Library Ave., Newark, Delaware; (302) 731-7550

1865 births
1942 deaths
Methodists from Delaware
People from Wilmington, Delaware
Washington and Lee University School of Law alumni
Delaware lawyers
Burials in Kent County, Delaware
Democratic Party members of the United States House of Representatives from Delaware
People from Clayton, Delaware
People from New Castle County, Delaware